Samuel Prather Snider (October 9, 1845 – September 24, 1928) was a representative from Minnesota. He was born in Mount Gilead, Morrow County, Ohio and attended the public schools, the local high school at Mount Gilead, Ohio, and Oberlin College, Ohio.

During the Civil War he enlisted as a private soldier in the Sixty-fifth Regiment, Ohio Volunteer Infantry. After the war he engaged in commercial pursuits in New York, moved to Minnesota in 1876 and settled in Minneapolis.

He organized and built the Midland Railway in southern Minnesota and engaged in agricultural pursuits and the mining of iron ore.

he was a member of the Minnesota House of Representatives 1884–1888; was elected as a Republican to the 51st United States Congress (March 4, 1889 – March 3, 1891). He was also unsuccessful for reelection in 1890 to the 52nd congress. He was a delegate to the Republican National Convention in 1892.

He retired and resided in Minneapolis until his death, interment was in Lakewood Cemetery.

References

External links 
 

1845 births
1928 deaths
Republican Party members of the Minnesota House of Representatives
Oberlin College alumni
People from Mount Gilead, Ohio
Republican Party members of the United States House of Representatives from Minnesota